Segunda Chamada (English: Second Call) is a Brazilian television series produced by O2 Filmes. The first season of the series was aired by TV Globo from October 8, 2019 to December 17, 2019, and the second season was released on Globoplay on September 10, 2021. Based on the play Conselho de Classe, by Jô Bilac, it is written by Carla Faour and Julia Spadaccini. It stars Débora Bloch, Paulo Gorgulho, Hermila Guedes, Silvio Guindane and Thalita Carauta.

Cast

Main

Recurrent

Guests

Episodes

References

External links
Official site
Segunda Chamada at Globoplay

2019 Brazilian television series debuts
2021 Brazilian television series endings
Portuguese-language television shows
Rede Globo original programming
Brazilian drama television series
Television shows set in São Paulo
Television series about educators